Roos may also refer to:

People
 Roos (surname)
 Roos Abels (born 1999), Dutch fashion model
 Roos Drost (born 1991), Dutch field hockey player
 Roos Hoogeboom (born 1982), Dutch racing cyclist
 Roos van Montfort (born 1989), Dutch model, January 2014 Playboy centerfold model
 Roos Vermeij (born 1968), Dutch politician
 Roos Vonk (born 1960), Dutch psychologist and columnist

Places
 Roos, a village in East Yorkshire, England

Sports
 Roos, a common short name for the North Melbourne Football Club Kangaroos, an Australian rules football club
 Roos, a common short name for the Triabunna Football Club Kangaroos, an Australian rules football club
 Doonside Roos, an Australian rugby league football club
 Wyong Roos, an Australian rugby league football club
 Lake Macquarie Roos, a Newcastle and Hunter Rugby Union club
 Golden Gate Roos, a United States Australian Football League Australian rules football team based in San Francisco
 Kansas City Roos, the athletic teams of the University of Missouri–Kansas City
 Roos, the short form of the State University of New York at Canton Kangaroos, the school's athletic teams
 Roos, the short form of the Austin College Kangaroos, the school's athletic teams
 Roos Field, Eastern Washington University's football stadium

Other uses
 Roos, a common nickname for kangaroos
 Roos, short for KangaROOS, a brand of shoe with a pocket inside
 Roos, short for Roos Instruments, a manufacturer of Semiconductor automatic test equipment

See also
 Roo (disambiguation)

Dutch feminine given names
Hypocorisms